A coastal flood watch is issued by the National Weather Service of the United States when coastal flooding along the coast of the Atlantic Ocean, Pacific Ocean, or the Gulf of Mexico is possible. The flooding must be due to water being forced from the nearby body of water onto land, and not from rainfall. Nor'easters, hurricanes, tropical storms, and thunderstorms can all lead to the issuance of a coastal flood watch.

Example 
The following is an example of a coastal flood watch issued by the National Weather Service office in Taunton, Massachusetts.

000
WHUS41 KBOX 062129
CFWBOX

URGENT - IMMEDIATE BROADCAST REQUESTED
COASTAL HAZARD MESSAGE
NATIONAL WEATHER SERVICE TAUNTON MA
429 PM EST WED FEB 6 2013

...COASTAL FLOOD WATCH FOR THE MASSACHUSETTS EAST FACING COASTLINE
AROUND THE TIME OF THE FRIDAY EVENING AND SATURDAY MORNING HIGH
TIDES...

.A POWERFUL COASTAL STORM MAY PRODUCE MODERATE COASTAL FLOODING
FRIDAY EVENING AND MODERATE TO MAJOR COASTAL FLOODING SATURDAY
MORNING ALONG WITH POTENTIALLY SEVERE EROSION. LARGE WAVES
COMBINED WITH A 2 TO 3 FOOT STORM SURGE MAY CAUSE A NUMBER OF
VULNERABLE SHORE ROADS TO BECOME IMPASSABLE FOR A WHILE...AND
POSSIBLY EVEN PUT HOMES ALONG THE IMMEDIATE SHORELINE AT RISK FOR
DAMAGE DURING THE SATURDAY MORNING HIGH TIDE.

MAZ007-015-016-019-022>024-070530-
/O.NEW.KBOX.CF.A.0001.130209T0100Z-130209T1800Z/
EASTERN ESSEX MA-SUFFOLK MA-EASTERN NORFOLK MA-
EASTERN PLYMOUTH MA-BARNSTABLE MA-DUKES MA-NANTUCKET MA-
429 PM EST WED FEB 6 2013

...COASTAL FLOOD WATCH IN EFFECT FROM FRIDAY EVENING THROUGH
SATURDAY AFTERNOON...

THE NATIONAL WEATHER SERVICE IN TAUNTON HAS ISSUED A COASTAL
FLOOD WATCH...WHICH IS IN EFFECT FROM FRIDAY EVENING THROUGH
SATURDAY AFTERNOON.

* LOCATION...EAST FACING COASTLINE OF MASSACHUSETTS

* COASTAL FLOODING...POSSIBLE MODERATE COASTAL FLOODING FOR THE
  FRIDAY EVENING HIGH TIDE AND POSSIBLE MODERATE TO MAJOR COASTAL
  FLOODING FOR THE SATURDAY MORNING HIGH TIDE.

* TIMING...FRIDAY EVENING AND SATURDAY MORNING HIGH TIDES

* IMPACTS...A NUMBER OF SHORE ROADS COULD BECOME IMPASSABLE FOR A
  TIME FRIDAY EVENING. COASTAL FLOODING AROUND THE SATURDAY
  MORNING HIGH TIDE COULD CAUSE NUMEROUS SHORE ROADS TO BECOME
  IMPASSABLE AND EVEN PUT SOME STRUCTURES AT RISK ALONG THE
  IMMEDIATE SHORE. IN ADDITION SEVERE BEACH EROSION MAY OCCUR
  DURING THE FRIDAY EVENING AND SATURDAY MORNING HIGH TIDES.

A 3 FOOT STORM SURGE IS POSSIBLE FOR FRIDAY EVENING...AND A 2 TO 3
FOOT STORM SURGE MAY OCCUR AT THE TIME OF THE SATURDAY MORNING
HIGH TIDE. DURING BOTH HIGH TIDES...A FEW LOW LYING LOCATIONS
NEAR THE SHORE MAY BE FLOODED UP TO 2 OR 3 FEET DEEP.

PRECAUTIONARY/PREPAREDNESS ACTIONS...

A COASTAL FLOOD WATCH MEANS THAT THE POTENTIAL EXISTS FOR
MODERATE OR MAJOR COASTAL FLOODING.  MODERATE COASTAL FLOODING
PRODUCES WIDESPREAD FLOODING OF VULNERABLE SHORE ROADS AND/OR
BASEMENTS DUE TO THE HEIGHT OF STORM TIDE AND/OR WAVE ACTION.
NUMEROUS ROAD CLOSURES ARE NEEDED. LIVES MAY BE AT RISK FOR
PEOPLE WHO PUT THEMSELVES IN HARMS WAY. ISOLATED STRUCTURAL
DAMAGE MAY BE OBSERVED.

MAJOR COASTAL FLOODING IS CONSIDERED SEVERE ENOUGH TO CAUSE AT
LEAST SCATTERED STRUCTURAL DAMAGE ALONG WITH WIDESPREAD FLOODING
OF VULNERABLE SHORE ROADS AND/OR BASEMENTS.  SOME VULNERABLE
HOMES MAY BE SEVERELY DAMAGED OR DESTROYED. EVACUATION OF SOME
NEIGHBORHOODS MAY BE NECESSARY.

&&

&&

ALL TIDE HEIGHTS ARE RELATIVE TO MEAN LOWER LOW WATER.
TIME OF HIGH TOTAL TIDES ARE APPROXIMATE TO THE NEAREST HOUR.

NEWBURYPORT

   TOTAL                ASTRO
    TIDE    DAY/TIME     TIDE    SURGE    WAVES      FLOOD
    /FT/                 /FT/     /FT/     /FT/    CATEGORY
  -------  ----------  -------  -------  -------  ----------
     7.7    06/08 PM     7.7      0.0      2-3       NONE
     9.2    07/08 AM     9.2      0.0       2        NONE
     8.0    07/09 PM     8.0      0.0       1        NONE
     9.6    08/09 AM     9.4      0.2      2-4       NONE
    10.8    08/10 PM     8.3      2.5      9-14     MINOR
    11.6    09/10 AM     9.6      2.0     16-18    MODERATE

GLOUCESTER HARBOR

   TOTAL                ASTRO
    TIDE    DAY/TIME     TIDE    SURGE    WAVES      FLOOD
    /FT/                 /FT/     /FT/     /FT/    CATEGORY
  -------  ----------  -------  -------  -------  ----------
     8.5    06/08 PM     8.5      0.0       3        NONE
    10.1    07/08 AM    10.1      0.0      2-3       NONE
     8.8    07/09 PM     8.8      0.0       1        NONE
    10.7    08/09 AM    10.4      0.3      2-5       NONE
    11.7    08/10 PM     9.2      2.5     11-20     MINOR
    12.6    09/10 AM    10.6      2.0     22-24    MINOR-MDT

REVERE

   TOTAL                ASTRO
    TIDE    DAY/TIME     TIDE    SURGE    WAVES      FLOOD
    /FT/                 /FT/     /FT/     /FT/    CATEGORY
  -------  ----------  -------  -------  -------  ----------
     8.9    06/08 PM     8.9      0.0       2        NONE
    10.6    07/08 AM    10.6      0.0       2        NONE
     9.3    07/09 PM     9.3      0.0       1        NONE
    11.1    08/09 AM    10.9      0.2      2-4       NONE
    12.7    08/10 PM     9.7      3.0      8-13     MINOR
    13.2    09/10 AM    11.2      2.0     14-16    MODERATE

BOSTON HARBOR

   TOTAL                ASTRO
    TIDE    DAY/TIME     TIDE    SURGE    WAVES      FLOOD
    /FT/                 /FT/     /FT/     /FT/    CATEGORY
  -------  ----------  -------  -------  -------  ----------
     8.9    06/08 PM     8.9      0.0       2        NONE
    10.6    07/08 AM    10.6      0.0       2        NONE
     9.3    07/09 PM     9.3      0.0       1        NONE
    11.1    08/09 AM    10.9      0.2      1-2       NONE
    13.2    08/10 PM    10.2      3.0      3-4     MODERATE
    13.6    09/10 AM    11.6      2.0       4      MODERATE

SCITUATE

   TOTAL                ASTRO
    TIDE    DAY/TIME     TIDE    SURGE    WAVES      FLOOD
    /FT/                 /FT/     /FT/     /FT/    CATEGORY
  -------  ----------  -------  -------  -------  ----------
     8.8    06/08 PM     8.8      0.0      2-3       NONE
    10.4    07/08 AM    10.4      0.0       2        NONE
     9.1    07/09 PM     9.1      0.0      1-2       NONE
    11.0    08/09 AM    10.7      0.3      2-5       NONE
    12.5    08/10 PM     9.5      3.0     10-18    MODERATE
    12.9    09/10 AM    10.9      2.0     21-23    MDT-MAJOR

SANDWICH HARBOR

   TOTAL                ASTRO
    TIDE    DAY/TIME     TIDE    SURGE    WAVES      FLOOD
    /FT/                 /FT/     /FT/     /FT/    CATEGORY
  -------  ----------  -------  -------  -------  ----------
     8.4    06/08 PM     8.4      0.0      2-3       NONE
    10.0    07/08 AM    10.0      0.0      2-3       NONE
     8.7    07/09 PM     8.7      0.0       1        NONE
    10.7    08/09 AM    10.2      0.5      2-4       NONE
    12.6    08/10 PM     9.1      3.5      7-12    MODERATE
    14.7    09/10 AM    10.4      4.3     16-18     MAJOR

PROVINCETOWN HARBOR

   TOTAL                ASTRO
    TIDE    DAY/TIME     TIDE    SURGE    WAVES      FLOOD
    /FT/                 /FT/     /FT/     /FT/    CATEGORY
  -------  ----------  -------  -------  -------  ----------
     9.0    06/08 PM     9.0      0.0      3-4       NONE
    10.6    07/08 AM    10.6      0.0       3        NONE
     9.3    07/09 PM     9.3      0.0      1-2       NONE
    11.0    08/09 AM    10.8      0.2      2-4       NONE
    11.2    08/10 PM     9.6      1.6      7-13      NONE
    12.0    09/10 AM    11.0      1.0     14-15     MINOR

CHATHAM - EAST COAST

   TOTAL                ASTRO
    TIDE    DAY/TIME     TIDE    SURGE    WAVES      FLOOD
    /FT/                 /FT/     /FT/     /FT/    CATEGORY
  -------  ----------  -------  -------  -------  ----------
     3.8    06/08 PM     3.8      0.0      3-4       NONE
     4.9    07/09 AM     4.9      0.0      3-4       NONE
     3.9    07/09 PM     3.9      0.0       2        NONE
     5.7    08/10 AM     5.0      0.7      4-6       NONE
     7.1    08/10 PM     4.1      3.0     12-17      NONE
     7.7    09/11 AM     5.0      2.7     21-22     MINOR

CHATHAM - SOUTH COAST

   TOTAL                ASTRO
    TIDE    DAY/TIME     TIDE    SURGE    WAVES      FLOOD
    /FT/                 /FT/     /FT/     /FT/    CATEGORY
  -------  ----------  -------  -------  -------  ----------
     3.6    06/09 PM     3.6      0.0       3        NONE
     4.8    07/09 AM     4.8      0.0       2        NONE
     3.7    07/10 PM     3.7      0.0      1-2       NONE
     5.3    08/10 AM     4.9      0.4      3-5       NONE
     5.4    08/11 PM     3.9      1.5      8-10      NONE
     5.9    09/11 AM     4.9      1.0     10-11      NONE

BUZZARDS BAY - WOODS HOLE

   TOTAL                ASTRO
    TIDE    DAY/TIME     TIDE    SURGE    WAVES      FLOOD
    /FT/                 /FT/     /FT/     /FT/    CATEGORY
  -------  ----------  -------  -------  -------  ----------
     1.6    06/05 PM     1.6      0.0       2        NONE
     2.4    07/05 AM     2.4      0.0       2        NONE
     1.8    07/06 PM     1.8      0.0       2        NONE
     2.8    08/06 AM     2.6      0.2       2        NONE
     3.9    08/06 PM     1.9      2.0      5-6       NONE
     2.7    09/07 AM     2.6      0.1       9        NONE

VINEYARD HAVEN

   TOTAL                ASTRO
    TIDE    DAY/TIME     TIDE    SURGE    WAVES      FLOOD
    /FT/                 /FT/     /FT/     /FT/    CATEGORY
  -------  ----------  -------  -------  -------  ----------
     1.8    06/08 PM     1.8      0.0       2        NONE
     2.7    07/08 AM     2.7      0.0       2        NONE
     1.9    07/09 PM     1.9      0.0      1-2       NONE
     3.2    08/09 AM     2.7      0.5      2-3       NONE
     4.2    08/10 PM     2.0      2.2      6-8       NONE
     4.7    09/10 AM     2.7      2.0      8-9       NONE

NANTUCKET HARBOR

   TOTAL                ASTRO
    TIDE    DAY/TIME     TIDE    SURGE    WAVES      FLOOD
    /FT/                 /FT/     /FT/     /FT/    CATEGORY
  -------  ----------  -------  -------  -------  ----------
     2.7    06/09 PM     2.7      0.0       3        NONE
     3.9    07/09 AM     3.9      0.0       2        NONE
     2.9    07/10 PM     2.9      0.0      1-2       NONE
     4.4    08/10 AM     3.9      0.5      3-5       NONE
     5.2    08/11 PM     3.0      2.2      8-10    MINOR-MDT
     5.9    09/11 AM     3.9      2.0     10-12    MODERATE

NANTUCKET EAST COAST

   TOTAL                ASTRO
    TIDE    DAY/TIME     TIDE    SURGE    WAVES      FLOOD
    /FT/                 /FT/     /FT/     /FT/    CATEGORY
  -------  ----------  -------  -------  -------  ----------
     2.9    06/08 PM     2.9      0.0      3-4       NONE
     4.1    07/09 AM     4.1      0.0       3        NONE
     3.0    07/09 PM     3.0      0.0       2        NONE
     4.5    08/10 AM     4.1      0.4      4-7       NONE
     5.3    08/10 PM     3.1      2.2     12-14     MINOR
     6.1    09/11 AM     4.1      2.0     16-17    MODERATE

NANTUCKET SOUTH COAST

   TOTAL                ASTRO
    TIDE    DAY/TIME     TIDE    SURGE    WAVES      FLOOD
    /FT/                 /FT/     /FT/     /FT/    CATEGORY
  -------  ----------  -------  -------  -------  ----------
     2.7    06/09 PM     2.7      0.0       4        NONE
     3.9    07/09 AM     3.9      0.0      2-3       NONE
     2.8    07/10 PM     2.8      0.0       2        NONE
     4.3    08/10 AM     3.9      0.4      4-7       NONE
     4.2    08/10 PM     2.9      1.3     12-14      NONE
     4.0    09/11 AM     3.9      0.1     14-15      NONE

$$

THOMPSON/NOCERA

See also 
 Severe weather terminology (United States)

References

External links 
 National Weather Service

Weather warnings and advisories